"Right by Your Side" is a song written and recorded by Australian rock musician Jimmy Barnes. Released in August 1993 as the fourth and final single from his sixth studio album, Heat. The song peaked at number 43 on the ARIA charts.

Track listing
 CD Single (D11529)
 "Right by Your Side"	
 "Lovething"	
 "Love Will Find a Way" (Rough Mix)

Charts

References

Mushroom Records singles
1993 singles
1993 songs
Jimmy Barnes songs
Song recordings produced by Don Gehman
Songs written by Jimmy Barnes